It's a Long Road (Όλα είναι δρόμος Óla eínai drómos) is a 1998 film by Greek film director Pantelis Voulgaris. It is a triptych, with all three parts taking place in Thrace, one of the more economically depressed parts of Greece.

Cast
 Thanasis Veggos as  Antonis
 Giorgos Armenis as Makis Tsetsenoglou
 Dimitris Kataleifos as Vasilis Vasileiadis

Awards

External links
 
 Όλα είναι δρόμος critique from the Greek cinema club.

1998 films
1990s Greek-language films
1998 drama films
Films directed by Pantelis Voulgaris
Greek drama films